Jakob Lindberg (born 16 October 1952) is a Swedish lutenist, performing solo, in small and large ensembles, and also directing operas, using instruments of the lute and guitar families. He is known for the first ever recording of the Complete Solo Lute Music of John Dowland as well as for recording music never before recorded, with repertoire dating back to the Renaissance period.

Biography
Jakob Lindberg was born in Djursholm, Sweden on 16 October 1952 and began his studies on the guitar with his first inspirations being the music of The Beatles. At the age of fourteen, he started studying the guitar with Jörgen Rörby; it was Rörby who first introduced Lindberg to the lute.

Lindberg studied music at Stockholm University before going on to study at the Royal College of Music in London. He combined his studies with Diana Poulton on lute and classical guitar with Carlos Bonell at the RCM and began to focus his attention on performing Renaissance and Baroque music on period instruments. Lindberg's solo Wigmore Hall recital debut took place in 1978, and he has subsequently toured internationally throughout Europe, the United States and Canada, Japan, Mexico, Russia, and Australia, as a soloist, accompanist, continuo player, and ensemble/consort player.

Teaching
Lindberg started teaching as a professor of lute at the Royal College of Music in London in 1979, taking over the position from Diana Poulton, together with taking part in lecture recitals (as for example Gresham College, London).

Performing
Lindberg has recorded lute music that had never before been recorded, largely under the BIS label. Recorded works include Italian chitarrone collections, music by Scottish composers, the first ever recording of the complete solo lute music by John Dowland, and solo lute works of Johann Sebastian Bach, together with chamber music by Vivaldi, Boccherini, and Haydn.

He founded the Dowland Consort in 1985, which specialized in performing music from Elizabethan and Jacobean times, most notably John Dowland and Sylvius Leopold Weiss. As a continuo player (theorbo, chitarrone, and archlute), he has performed with many period instrument ensembles, such as the English Concert, the Orchestra of the Age of Enlightenment, the Academy of Ancient Music, the Taverner Choir, the Monteverdi Choir, the Purcell Quartet, and the Chiaroscuro Quartet. He is a frequent accompanist for singers such as Nigel Rogers, Ian Partridge, Emma Kirkby, and Anne Sofie von Otter. Lindberg has directed several Baroque operas from the chitarrone at the Drottningholm Palace Theatre as a production staged by the Royal Swedish Opera. His opera performances include Purcell's Dido and Aeneas in 1995 in which he collaborated with Andrew Parrot, and Jacopo Peri's Euridice in 1997. On 3 July 2013, Lindberg gave a concert of the music of John Dowland at The Queen's Gallery, Buckingham Palace to coincide with the 350th anniversary of John Dowland's birth.

Lindberg appears in and plays the lute in the 1983 Doctor Who episode "The King's Demons".

Instruments
 Rauwolf Lute: made by Sixtus Rauwolf, Augsburg c. 1590, one of the few extant, "possibly the world's oldest lute in playing condition." Originally a 7-8 course instrument, modified in 1715 to incorporate an extended neck, with the work labelled "Leonhard Mausiel of Nüremberg 1715" inside the lute body. The restoration has been made for this instrument to accommodate 11-course d minor, or 10-course Renaissance tuning/stringing. 
 6-course lute: made by Michael Lowe, Oxford 1985, based on European lutes used c.1500-1550.
 8-course lute: made by Michael Lowe, Oxford 1980, based on an Italian 1580 model, employing yew wood for the back ribs, each strip containing both sapwood and heartwood rendering a stunning natural striped effect.
 10-course lute: made by Michael Lowe, Oxford 1977, with a yew wood back of 31 ribs.
 13-course lute: made by Michael Lowe, Oxford 1981, based on models from c.1720 Germany, with a rosewood back, and a lower pegbox extended to an upper pegbox, supporting longer bass strings, lending a rich strength of sound to the lower tessitura.

Compositions dedicated to Jakob Lindberg
Composer: Richard Popplewell; Title: Variations on Brigg Fair; Scoring: solo lute; Date: 1988.

Discography

References

External links
 

Swedish lutenists
Swedish classical musicians
Swedish classical guitarists
1952 births
Living people